Carex toreadora is a little-known species of sedge from Ecuador. There it grew in "moist mossy boggy places bordering [an] alpine lake". No further collections have ever been made, and the species is listed as endangered on the IUCN Red List. It is classified in Carex sect. Ovales, and is thought to be closely related to species such as Carex mandoniana and Carex macloviana.

References

toreadora
Endemic flora of Ecuador
Endangered plants
Plants described in 1964
Taxonomy articles created by Polbot